Skeen's Mill Covered Bridge was a wooden covered bridge that spanned a branch of the Little Uwharrie River in Randolph County, North Carolina.  It was built between about 1885 and 1900, and measured 100 feet long.  The bridge had a combination of Ithiel Town lattice truss and queenpost truss construction.  It had a gable roof and board-and-batten siding.  It has been demolished.

It was added to the National Register of Historic Places in 1972.

References

Bridges completed in 1900
Transportation in Randolph County, North Carolina
Covered bridges on the National Register of Historic Places in North Carolina
Wooden bridges in North Carolina
Former road bridges in North Carolina
Buildings and structures in Randolph County, North Carolina
National Register of Historic Places in Randolph County, North Carolina
Road bridges on the National Register of Historic Places in North Carolina
Lattice truss bridges in the United States